Taha Siddiqui is a Pakistani-born journalist based in Paris. He is an active critic of the establishment of Pakistan.

Early life and career
He is a graduate of Institute of Business Administration, Karachi. He is also founder of the SAFE Newsrooms.

In January 2018, in Islamabad gunmen tried to abduct Siddiqui, but he managed to escape.

In April 2022, Siddiqui posted several tweets praising a suicide bomber of the Balochistan Liberation Army, who committed a terrorist attack at the University of Karachi killing three tutors and a van driver.

Awards
 Albert Londres Prize (2014)

References

Living people
Pakistani male journalists
Pakistani refugees
Pakistani emigrants to France
Institute of Business Administration, Karachi alumni
Albert Londres Prize recipients
Kidnappings in Pakistan
1984 births
People from Karachi
Journalists from Karachi